Harold Kelly may refer to:

Pat Kelly (outfielder), Harold Patrick Kelly (1944 – 2005), American baseball player
Harold Kelly, of Och-Ziff Capital Management

See also
Harry Kelly (disambiguation)
Harold Kelley (disambiguation)